Honky-Tonk Girl may refer to:

 "Honky-Tonk Girl" (Hank Thompson song), a 1954 song by Hank Thompson, notably covered in 1960 by Johnny Cash
 "I'm a Honky Tonk Girl", a 1960 song by Loretta Lynn